General election, 1945 may refer to:

 1945 Sammarinese general election
 1945 United Kingdom general election
 1945 Faroese general election
 1945 Maltese general election
 1945 Nova Scotia general election
 1945 British Columbia general election
 1945 Liechtenstein general election
 1945 Peruvian general election 
 1945 Northern Ireland general election
 1945 Indian general election 
 1945 Manitoba general election 
 1945 Nova Scotia general election 
 1945 Ontario general election

See also
 List of elections in 1945